Philip (or Philippus) of Opus, was a philosopher and a member of the Academy during Plato's lifetime. Philip was the editor of Plato's Laws. Philip of Opus is probably identical with the Philip of Medma (or Mende), the astronomer, who is also described as a disciple of Plato.

Plato's Laws and Epinomis
According to Diogenes Laërtius, Philip of Opus was a disciple of Plato, who was responsible for transcribing Plato's Laws into twelve books, and writing the thirteenth book (the Epinomis) himself:
Some say that Philip the Opuntian transcribed his [Plato's] work, Laws, which was written in wax [wooden tablets coated with wax].  They also say that the Epinomis [the thirteenth book of the Laws], is his.
In the Suda, Philip is listed anonymously under the heading of philosophos ("philosopher"), his name being lost from the beginning of the entry: 
Philosopher who divided the Laws of Plato into 12 books; for he himself is said to have added the 13th. And he was a pupil of Socrates and of Plato himself, occupied with the study of the heavens. Living in the time of Philip of Macedon, he wrote the following: On the distance of the sun and moon; On gods; On time; On myths; On freedom; On anger; On reciprocation; On the Opuntian Lokrians; On pleasure; On passion; On friends and friendship; On writing; On Plato; On eclipse(s) of the moon; On the size of the sun and moon and earth; On lightning; On the planets; Arithmetic; On prolific numbers; Optics; Enoptics; Kykliaka; Means; etc.
Since the entry is located under the heading philosophos, the defect presumably existed in the source from which the Suda borrowed. It was not until the 18th century when Ludolf Küster, the editor of the Suda, identified this anonymous entry with the Philip of Opus mentioned by Diogenes Laërtius.

Philip the astronomer
Because he is identified in the Suda as an astronomer, it is generally assumed that Philip of Opus is the same person as Philip of Medma, (also called Philip of Mende) who was an astronomer and mathematician and a disciple of Plato. 
Philip of Medma is mentioned by several ancient writers, such as Vitruvius, Pliny the Elder, Plutarch, (who states that he demonstrated the figure of the Moon), Proclus, and Alexander of Aphrodisias. His astronomical observations were made in the Peloponnese and in Locris (where Opus was a principal city), and were used by the astronomers Hipparchus, Geminus of Rhodes, and Ptolemy. He is said by Stephanus of Byzantium to have written a treatise on the winds.

Notes

Further reading
 Tarán, Leonardo.  Academica: Plato, Philip of Opus, and the pseudo-Platonic Epinomis.  Philadelphia: American Philosophical Society, 1975.

Academic philosophers
Ancient Greek astronomers
Classical Greek philosophers
4th-century BC philosophers
4th-century BC Greek people